Maggie Marie Sajak (born January 5, 1995) is an American country music singer. She is the daughter of Wheel of Fortune host Pat Sajak and photographer Lesly Brown Sajak.

Life and career
Maggie Marie Sajak was born January 5, 1995 to television host Pat Sajak and his wife, Lesly. She grew up in the Severna Park, Maryland, area. She began playing the guitar at age 12. In 2011, she released her first single, "First Kiss". The music video for "First Kiss" was directed by Trey Fanjoy in Nashville, Tennessee. Sajak's video was featured on the January 3, 2012, episode of Wheel of Fortune on the occasion of her 17th birthday. In 2013, Sajak recorded a song in Nashville called "Live Out Loud" to honor Muriel Walters, a teenage girl in Maryland who was battling cancer. Soon afterward, one of her songs was featured in the season finale of Sweet Home Alabama.

In 2013 Sajak began her freshman year at Princeton University, and did a fashion shoot for Teen Vogue.

For a week of episodes of Wheel of Fortune airing in January 2020, Maggie Sajak took over for that show's hostess Vanna White. This was due to White filling in as host due to Pat Sajak undergoing surgery. For the 2021–2022 season, Sajak joined Wheel as a social media correspondent.

Discography
First Kiss (AO Recordings, 2011)

Music videos

Television
Wheel of Fortune (5 episodes in 2020)

Soundtracks 
"Sweet Home Alabama" on CMT, episode 1.08: "Finale" – with "First Kiss"

References

External links

1995 births
American child singers
American women country singers
American country singer-songwriters
Child pop musicians
Place of birth missing (living people)
Living people
Musicians from Baltimore
Country musicians from Maryland
American people of Polish descent
People from Severna Park, Maryland
Princeton University alumni
Singer-songwriters from Maryland
21st-century American singers
21st-century American women singers